Limonius infuscatus, the Western field wireworm, is a nocturnal species of click beetle in the family Elateridae and native to the northwestern United States.

References

Elateridae